is a railway station located in the town of  Mitake,  Gifu Prefecture,  Japan, operated by the private railway operator Meitetsu.

Lines

Station layout
Gōdo Station has one ground-level side platform serving a single bi-directional track. There is no station building. The station is unattended.

Adjacent stations

History
Gōdo Station opened on October 1, 1928.

Surrounding area
The station is located in a residential area.

See also
 List of Railway Stations in Japan

References

External links
 
  

Railway stations in Japan opened in 1928
Stations of Nagoya Railroad
Railway stations in Gifu Prefecture
Mitake, Gifu